Mack Avenue Engine Complex is a  Chrysler automobile factory in Detroit, Michigan.

History
The original factory ("Old Mack") was originally built in 1916 by the Michigan Stamping Company. When Michigan Stamping was sold to Briggs Manufacturing Company in 1920, Briggs made bodies there for Plymouth, Ford, and others. Chrysler Corporation bought Mack Avenue and 11 other plants from Briggs in 1953, and continued to use it as a stamping plant for the nearby Dodge Main factory, Lynch Road Assembly, and Jefferson Avenue Assembly plants. 

In 1979 a financially hurting Chrysler closed the now outdated factory and all but abandoned the site, which became derelict, overgrown, and a toxic brownfield. The city of Detroit bought it in 1982, but was unable to find a purchaser or afford environmental remediation for the site, and returned it to Chrysler. In 1990 Chrysler began cleanup and demolition of the old plant, and built a new factory on the site ("New Mack").   

It was the original production site for the Dodge Viper, from 1992 through 1995 when the Viper moved to Conner Avenue Assembly. It was converted into an engine plant in 1998, with the additional  of "Mack Engine II" added in 1999  The total employees of both factories are about 1,300, which are represented by UAW local 51. (closed since September 9, 2012).

On April 9, 2013 Mack Engine I produced the last PowerTech 4.7 L  V8 engine and is to switch to Pentastar V6 production. To switch to Pentastar production, 197 million dollars will be invested in Mack Engine I and up to 250 jobs are to be added. 

On the 6th of December 2018, Fiat Chrysler Automobiles announced that the Mack Avenue Engine Complex will be reopened and converted back into a vehicle assembly plant to make the next generation Jeep Grand Cherokee L starting in 2021.

Products

Previous engines 
 4.7 L Chrysler PowerTech engine V8 (Mack Engine I)
 3.7 L Chrysler PowerTech engine V6 (Mack Engine II)
 3.0 L, 3.2 L, and 3.6 L Chrysler Pentastar engine V6 (Mack Engine I)

Current models 
Jeep Grand Cherokee L (2021–present)
Jeep Grand Cherokee (2022–present)
Jeep Grand Cherokee 4xe (2022–present)

See also
List of Chrysler factories

References

Chrysler factories
Industrial buildings and structures in Detroit
Motor vehicle assembly plants in Michigan
1916 establishments in Michigan